Shah Ali Beyglu (also Romanized as Shāh ‘Alī Beyglū; also known as Shalveli) is a village in Kaghazkonan-e Shomali Rural District, Kaghazkonan District, Meyaneh County, East Azerbaijan Province, Iran. At the 2006 census, its population was 65, in 29 families.

References 

Populated places in Meyaneh County